Jean Marc Monrose (born 4 August 1981) is a French boxer that has fought at cruiserweight.  Monrose was the European Boxing Union cruiserweight champion, but lost his title to Marco Huck.

Monrose has also fought former UFC fighter Alessio Sakara, Steve Hérélius (twice) and Denton Daley.

References

External links

1981 births
Living people
French male boxers
Cruiserweight boxers